Laura Kate Turner-Alleyne (born 12 August 1982) is a British former sprinter, who represented Great Britain at the 2008 Olympics, in the 4 × 100 m relay and the 100 m. She competed in four Athletics World Championships and took five British national championship titles across her career, in 60 m, 100 m and 200 m.

She was part of the British 4 × 100 m relay team that finished 4th at the 2007 World Championships in Athletics in Osaka (along with Montell Douglas, Joice Maduaka and Emily Freeman).

Turner represented Great Britain at the 2008 Summer Olympics in Beijing, competing at the 100 m sprint. In her first round heat she placed fourth in a time of 11.65, which was not enough to advance to the second round.

At the 2010 Commonwealth Games in Delhi, Turner, competing for England, was involved in the controversial false start incident as a result of which the race winner Sally Pearson was later disqualified. Both Turner and Pearson false-started, but initially only Turner was given the red card to exclude her from the race. Turner immediately protested at being singled out, and decided to run the race and appeal afterwards. She finished last, and her appeal was turned down. Pearson was subsequently disqualified and the gold medal was awarded to Nigeria's Oludamola Osayomi. However, she also won a gold medal in Delhi as part of the English team in the  relay, alongside Douglas, Katherine Endacott and Abiodun Oyepitan. She finished her competitive career in 2013, becoming a coach.

Turner attended Brunel University London, where she graduated with a BSc in Sports Sciences and an MSc in High Performance Physiology.

References

External links
Official Team GB page for Laura Turner

Living people
1982 births
Athletes from London
English athletics coaches
British female sprinters
English female sprinters
Olympic female sprinters
Olympic athletes of Great Britain
Athletes (track and field) at the 2008 Summer Olympics
Commonwealth Games gold medallists for England
Commonwealth Games silver medallists for England
Commonwealth Games gold medallists in athletics
Commonwealth Games medallists in athletics
Athletes (track and field) at the 2006 Commonwealth Games
Athletes (track and field) at the 2010 Commonwealth Games
World Athletics Championships athletes for Great Britain
British Athletics Championships winners
Alumni of Brunel University London
Medallists at the 2006 Commonwealth Games
Medallists at the 2010 Commonwealth Games